The Criminologist may refer to:

The Criminologist, the name of the official newsletter of the American Society of Criminology, published since 1976
The Criminologist (magazine), a crime magazine published between 1967 and 1998
The Criminologist (character), the narrator in The Rocky Horror Show and The Rocky Horror Picture Show